Miandu Town is an urban town in Yanling County, Hunan Province, People's Republic of China.

Cityscape
The town is divided into one village and 16 communities, the following areas: Mianduxu Community, Xiaoli Village, Shangguan Village, Huayuan Village, Pankeng Village, Xiaguan Village, Cangbei Village, Ruikou Village, Shanglao Village, Xiaoyang Village, Changjiang Village, Shitou Village, Longxiang Village, Suzhou Village, Dongli Village, Shiqiao Village, and Dajiang Village.

References

External links

Divisions of Yanling County